Sutter may refer to:

People
 Sutter (surname), a list of people with this name
 John Augustus Sutter, Sr. (1803–1880), Californian pioneer and founder of Sutter's Fort
 John Augustus Sutter, Jr. (1826–1897), his son, a U.S. Consul to Acapulco, Mexico and the founder and planner of the City of Sacramento, California
 Sutter family, a Canadian family that is one of the most famous in the National Hockey League

Place names
The following places are in the United States; some were named after John Sutter, Sr.:
Sutter, California, in Sutter County
Sutter, Hancock County, Illinois, unincorporated community
Sutter, Tazewell County, Illinois, unincorporated community
Sutter Avenue (disambiguation), stations of the New York City Subway in Brooklyn
Sutter Basin, in the Sacramento Valley in California
Sutter Buttes, eroded volcanic lava domes in California
Sutter County, California, along the Sacramento River in the Central Valley
Sutter Creek, California, a city in Amador County, California, United States
Sutter Hill, California, unincorporated community in Amador County, California
Sutter Pointe, California, proposed planned community in Sutter County
Sutterville, California, a former settlement in Sacramento County, California
Sutter's Fort, state-protected park in Sacramento, California
Sutter's Mill, sawmill owned by 19th century pioneer John Sutter

See also
Sutter Health, not-for-profit health system in Northern California, headquartered in Sacramento
Sutter Home Winery, large independent family-run winery in the United States
Sutter's Gold, 1936 fictionalized film version of the events leading to the California Gold Rush of 1849
DeSutter
Suter (disambiguation)
Suttner (disambiguation)